Lubieszów  is a village in the administrative district of Gmina Wymiarki, within Żagań County, Lubusz Voivodeship, in western Poland.

The village has an approximate population of 230.

References

Villages in Żagań County